Red Scarf (Hónglǐngjīn) is a London-based online media and digital marketing communications company aimed at helping British companies to plan and execute online marketing activities, which includes offline store events to engage with their UK-based Chinese customers.

History
Pauline Guo, a MA Marketing Communications graduate from London College of Communication, University of the Arts, founded the company in 2012.

After graduating she started Red Scarf as a blog on Sina Weibo, with Pauline posting about UK life, news and advice in her spare time. Her account became popular amongst Chinese students, mostly through word of mouth and interest in the topics covered. Chinese media has described her account as “the most useful account for Chinese students in the UK”.

About
The company owns and manages a UK lifestyle website, written in the Chinese language, under the Red Scarf name. The aim of the site is to help people from Mainland China that are currently living or visiting in the UK to experience and enjoy the best the UK has to offer.

Along with the website, Red Scarf is also on two popular Chinese Social media platforms, Sina Weibo and WeChat, each have more than 300k followers.

Name
Its readers commonly know Red Scarf as “honglingjin”, which is a direct translation of red scarf in Chinese. It is a symbol of the international communist pioneer movement and a compulsory part of the school uniform worn by every single primary school student in mainland China.

Website
The website covers 7 different categories, shopping, deals, restaurants, life, Holiday, Visa and events. It received over 6.5 million unique visitors in 2017, and on average 540k unique visitors per month, with 65% of traffic generated from the UK and 24% from China. The reader demographic from the latest 2017 Red Scarf Readers Survey shows are mostly females, aged 18 to 25, and study undergraduate and postgraduate degrees in the UK, mostly reside in England.

See also
Red Scarf British life handbook

References

External links
 www.honglingjin.co.uk

British companies established in 2012
Companies based in the London Borough of Lambeth
Chinese community in the United Kingdom